Malik Jalil Awan is a Pakistani politician who is a Member of the Pakitan Muslim League from 2013.

Early life and education
He was born on 1 February 1971 in Rawalpindi.

He has a degree of Bachelor of Laws which he obtained in 2000 from Punjab Law College.

Political career
He was elected to the Provincial Assembly of the Punjab as a candidate of Pakistan Muslim League (N) (PML-N) from Constituency PP-14 (Rawalpindi-XIV) in 2008 Pakistani general election. He received 26,489 votes and defeated Rashid Naseem Abbasi, a candidate of Pakistan Peoples Party.

He was re-elected to the Provincial Assembly of the Punjab as a candidate of PML-N from Constituency PP-14 (Rawalpindi-XIV) in 2013 Pakistani general election.

References

Living people
Punjab MPAs 2013–2018
Punjab MPAs 2008–2013
1971 births
Pakistan Muslim League (N) politicians